I Do, They Don't is a television movie starring Josie Bissett and Rob Estes. It premiered on ABC Family on March 20, 2005.  It was directed by Steven Robman.

Plot
Young widow Carrie Lewellyn has a successful cookies business and four kids: Andrew, Moira, little Nathan and little Daisy. Widower Jim Barber, a furniture maker, also has four: Andrew, Jeff, Lily and Sandy, plus a dog, Java. On their first weekend trip to Vegas together, they get married in the casino church. When they get back both their kids find out by magazines and TV. To try to merge the families before they move into one house, the families meet for a picnic. They both realize how hard everything will be now. Jim's family has a dog but Carrie's son Andrew is allergic. Jim's house is too small, and if they move into Carrie's they will be outsiders, but if they all move into a new house everyone would be uprooted. Moving day is a challenge as the Barbers move into Carrie's house, with Jim's eldest daughter, Sandy, being cold to Carrie. Andrew B. and Moira surprise everyone when they are found kissing in the back yard. To try to bring them together they have a hooky day. They go bowling, boys vs. girls. The girls win thanks to Carrie distracting Jim. When they do not fight, the kids try to play the parents against each other, which puts their marriage under pressure.

Cast
 Josie Bissett as Carrie Lewellyn   
 Rob Estes as Jim Barber   
 Lyndsy Fonseca as Sandy Barber, Jim's older daughter
 Ephraim Ellis as Jeff Barber, Jim's older son
 Martha MacIsaac as Moira Lewellyn, Carrie's older daughter
 Fraser McGregor as Andrew Barber, Jim's younger son
 Clare Stone as Lily Barber, Jim's younger daughter
 Kristopher Clarke as Andrew Lewellyn, Carrie's older son
 Jason Spevack as Nathan Lewellyn, Carrie's younger son
 Jessie Wright as Daisy Lewellyn, Carrie's younger daughter
 Tyler Hynes as Rusty
 Jayne Eastwood as Thelma
 Junior Williams as Eric Eckart
 Rahnuma Panthaky as Ginny Falls
 Hal Roberts as Las Vegas Reporter

External links
 

2005 television films
2005 films
ABC Family original films
Films directed by Steven Robman
2000s English-language films